Lawrence's dwarf gecko (Lygodactylus lawrencei) is a species of lizard in the family Gekkonidae. The species is native to Southern Africa.

Etymology
The specific name, lawrencei, is in honor of South African entomologist Reginald Frederick Lawrence.

Geographic range
L. lawrencei is found in southern Angola, and adjacent northern Namibia.

Description
L. lawrencei is a small species. Dorsally, it is ashy-gray with many thin broken dark stripes. Ventrally, it is white.

Habitat
The preferred habitat of L. lawrencei is rocky, dry savanna.

Reproduction
L. lawrencei is oviparous.

References

Further reading
Hewitt J (1926). "Some New or Little-known Reptiles and Batrachians from South Africa". Annals of the South African Museum 20: 473-490 + Plates XLIV-XLV. (Lygodactylus lawrencei, new species, pp. 478–479).

Lygodactylus
Reptiles of Angola
Reptiles of Namibia
Reptiles described in 1926
Taxa named by John Hewitt (herpetologist)